Feelin's is an album by saxophonist Teddy Edwards which was recorded in 1974 and first released on the Muse label.

Reception

In his review on Allmusic, Ken Dryden notes that "Teddy Edwards had not made a recording as a leader for quite a while at the time of this 1974 studio session for Muse, though after hearing this recording, one wonders why it took so long for someone to sign him. Focusing primarily on originals that mix hard bop and soul-jazz with a slight Latin flavor, the tenor saxophonist leads a fine sextet ."

Track listing 
All compositions by Teddy Edwards except where noted.
 "Bear Tracks" – 6:44  
 "April Love" – 6:55  
 "Ritta Ditta Blues" (Ray Brown) – 8:06  
 "Eleven Twenty Three" – 5:51  
 "Georgia on My Mind" (Hoagy Carmichael, Stuart Gorrell) – 6:53  
 "The Blue Sombrero" – 5:26

Personnel 
Teddy Edwards – tenor saxophone
Conte Candoli – trumpet
Dolo Coker – piano
Ray Brown – bass
Frank Butler – drums
Jerry Steinholz – congas, percussion

References 

Teddy Edwards albums
1975 albums
Muse Records albums
Albums produced by Don Schlitten